Events in the year 1870 in Japan.

Incumbents
Monarch: Emperor Meiji

Governors
Aichi Prefecture: 
Akita Prefecture: 
Aomori Prefecture: 
Fukushima Prefecture: 
Kyoto Prefecture: 
Mie Prefecture: 
Osaka Prefecture: 
Tokyo: 
Toyama Prefecture: 
Yamaguchi Prefecture:

Events
January 26 - The first public utility, Denshin, is established. (Traditional Japanese Date: Twenty-fifth Day of the Twelfth Month, 1869)

References

 
1870s in Japan
Japan
Years of the 19th century in Japan